Þorleifur Skaftason (1683–1748), was an Icelandic priest and Galdrmaster. He is known in Icelandic folklore, where he is the subject of many folk sagas about his alleged magical performances.

References 
„Saga latínuskóla á Íslandi til 1846. Tímarit hins íslenzka bókmenntafélags 1893.“,
„Galdra-Loftur. Söguleg rannsókn. Ísafold 9. janúar 1915.“,

1683 births
1748 deaths
17th-century Icelandic people
18th-century Icelandic people
Icelandic priests